Camp Meadowood Springs is a non-profit camp located near Weston, Oregon. During July it holds camp sessions for individuals ages 7–12 with communication and/or social learning challenges and their neurotypical peers/siblings.  It is sponsored by the Oregon Elks Lodge, with the camp facilities rented out during the rest of the year.

History
The camp was founded in 1964 as the Meadowood Springs Speech and Hearing Camp, by a group at the University of Oregon, who formed the non-profit Oregon Institute for Rehabilitation, Research and Recreation.
The Hendricks family of Milton-Freewater, Oregon, donated the land for the camp.

Originally, the camp focused on serving those with hearing and speech difficulties.  The camp started with fifteen children in its first session; thirty years later, it was serving over one hundred campers a year.  As of 2004, it was the only American Speech and Hearing certified camp in the United States.
More recently, the camp's mission has broadened to include those with other communication and social challenges.  Consequently, the name was changed in 2012 to Camp Meadowood Springs, as the staff agreed that it would better suit the growing curriculum.

The Oregon Elks Lodge adopted Camp Meadowood as a major project in 1973.  The Elks continue to support the camp with an annual banquet and golf tournaments, as well as fundraisers by individual lodges or members.  In addition to raising money for the camp's general budget, various Elks lodges in Oregon sponsor individual campers by covering their camp fees. Meadowood has also received individual and corporate donations for capital improvements.

At first, all the campers slept in framed tents. The very first building was not a cabin but the old Hub. After that, three sections were built. The buildings were colored by section: red roofs or red trim for buildings in section one, green for section two, and blue for section three.  By 1996 the facility had grown to over forty buildings.  Eventually, the old Hub was torn down and replaced.  A new bathhouse was built in 2007.

Qualifications
Children ages 6-14 can attend if they meet one or more of the following criteria, as listed in the camp's literature:
Have a diagnosis that affects speech and/or social learning (ASD, ADD/ADHD, Asperger's, Down syndrome, etc.);
Receive speech therapy or social skills training from a private clinician or within a public school environment (Educational Services);
Do not qualify for educational services but could benefit from them;
Are neurotypical (non-impacted) siblings and/or peers of other campers.

Staff
To enable campers to get the full benefits of therapy, Camp Meadowood Springs has a high staff-to-camper ratio, sometimes approaching 1-to-1.  The individual attention the children receive means they progress at a far faster rate than in a typical school setting.  Most therapists are university students majoring in a relevant therapy or pathology discipline.  These students work under the supervision of licensed clinicians, receiving valuable on-the-job training.  Many also earn college credits, or accumulate fieldwork hours toward their certifications.  This opportunity attracts students from across the United States and as far away as France.

There are other kinds of staff. Some of them are full-time employees who run the camp. They tend to be older people. Younger people who are just starting out typically serve as cabin counselors.  This includes some former campers.  People with more experience can be therapists, activity directors, or kitchen workers.

Daily life
Camp Meadowood's programs are currently one week in length for overnight campers, with a shorter program for day campers (who sleep offsite).  An overnight camper arrives on a Sunday afternoon and is checked in, while the staff review treatment plans with the parent(s) or caregiver(s), and gather any relevant information.  When the latter return the following Sunday to pick up the camper, the clinicians meet with them to review the camper's progress, report their observations and suggest ways to build on improvements made.

Both campers and staff choose their own "camp names" to use instead of  real names, to emphasize their individuality.  While popular superhero and cartoon character names are common, others choose something more unique, such as "Dr. Monkey."  The cabins are divided between girls' cabins and boys' cabins. Each cabin has two counselors.

Daily activities include traditional summer camp activities such as canoeing, swimming, fishing, and obstacle courses.  These are intermixed with therapy sessions, where campers learn social skills and how to make friends. Some therapy activities include reading SuperFlex books, starting conversations, and playing specialized games.  A unique feature of the camp is the "daily grid card," in which a camper is assigned a task to do ten times in one day, tailored to the camper's specific therapy goals, in order to earn rewards such as snacks.

On Saturday, members of the Oregon Elks Lodge visit the camp in the morning. There is a dance party after dinner, and then someone takes a canoe into the lake and sets the boats that the cabins made on fire.

Facility
The camp has three bath houses, an office/cafeteria, two ponds, a boat house, a pool, a pool house, a shop, caretaker's house, large trails that can accommodate cars, and two parking lots. It also has RV spaces, tents, and picnic places.
The facilities are open for rental yearlong at any time they are not being used for the speech camps.  As Camp Meadowood Springs is a non-profit organization, all rental income is used to keep the camp running.

Trends/Changes Over Time
When Camp Meadowood Springs was first founded, there were many campers, and there was even a waiting list. Eventually, due to a trend of decreasing amount of kids who go to summer camp, only four cabins were needed.

Because Camp Meadowood is always changing, they have a system to keep track of it. Every year the staff vote on a name, based on what happened that year (examples: Year of the Jellyfish because they all sang the jellyfish song, Year of Change because of the change in activities, Year of the Great Escape because some campers ran away in order to avoid going home, etc.).

Senator Mark O. Hatfield of Oregon lauded Meadowood in the 1996 Congressional Record, calling it "a model for the nation."

References

Meadowood Springs
1964 establishments in Oregon
Umatilla County, Oregon
Meadowood Springs